The Clerk of the Crown in Chancery in Great Britain is a senior civil servant who is the head of the Crown Office.

The Crown Office, a section of the Ministry of Justice, has custody of the Great Seal of the Realm, and has certain administrative functions in connection with the courts and the judicial process, as well as functions relating to the electoral process for House of Commons elections, to the keeping of the Roll of the Peerage, and to the preparation of royal documents such as warrants required to pass under the royal sign-manual, fiats, letters patent, etc.

History 

The position evolved from the mediaeval office of the Chancery. The first individual known to be designated as Clerk of the Crown in Chancery was Benedict Normanton in 1331. After 1384, it became common for two persons to hold the clerkship in two separate offices, and in some cases two persons held one of the offices in survivorship.

From 1885 onwards, the office of Clerk of the Crown in Chancery has always been held by the Permanent Secretary to the Lord Chancellor's Department (now the Ministry of Justice). The Clerk of the Crown is formally appointed by the monarch under the royal sign-manual; they must take an oath before assuming the office, which is now administered by the Lord Chancellor.

Responsibilities 
Since 1885, the office of Clerk of the Crown in Chancery has been combined with that of Permanent Secretary to the Lord Chancellor's Department (now the Ministry of Justice). The Clerk of the Crown in Chancery is appointed by the Monarch under the royal sign-manual.

All formal royal documents (such as warrants to be signed by the monarch; letters patent, both those that are signed by the King himself and those that are approved by warrant; and royal charters) are prepared by the Crown Office.

The Crown Office is also responsible for sealing with the Great Seal of the Realm all documents that need to pass under that seal, once the authority for the use of the seal is signified by the Sovereign (authorization to use the Seal is granted either by the monarch signing a warrant that approves the draft text of letters patent, directs that they be prepared and authorizes them to be sealed and issued; or by the Sovereign directly signing the letters patent that are to pass under the great seal, as is necessary in some cases, such as with letters patent that grant Royal Assent to bills passed by Parliament and with instruments of consent relating to royal marriages).

The Clerk of the Crown in Chancery discharges their functions regarding the use of the Great Seal and the preparation of royal warrants, letters patent, etc., under the direction of the Lord Chancellor, who is the keeper of the Great Seal of the Realm.

The Crown Office is also responsible for maintaining and updating the Roll of the Peerage. The Secretary of State for Justice is the keeper of the Peerage Roll, and his duties in that regard are daily discharged by a Registrar of the Peerage and a Deputy Registrar, who work within the Crown Office and are therefore under the supervision of the Clerk of the Crown in Chancery. The duties of the Ministry of Justice regarding the keeping and maintenance of the Roll of the Peerage are discharged in collaboration with the Garter King of Arms and Lord Lyon King of Arms, regarding their respective heraldic jurisdictions. The Crown Office also compiles the Official Roll of the Baronetage.

The Crown Office also has duties relating to the elections for the House of Commons. The Clerk of the Crown in Chancery initiates a parliamentary election in a constituency by sending an election writ to the returning officer of the constituency, and historically received all ballot papers and ballot stubs after the election was complete though they are now kept locally by the registration officer for each area (and retained for a year).

The Clerk issues election writs to all constituencies whenever the king makes a proclamation summoning a new parliament, and issues an election writ to a specific constituency whenever that constituency's seat is certified as vacant. The Clerk of the Crown in Chancery also prepares a Return Book, listing the names of all those who are returned as members of the House of Commons in a general election, and delivers that book to the Clerk of the House of Commons on the first day of a new parliament.

List of Clerks of the Crown

Canadian Clerk of the Crown in Chancery 
The office of Clerk of the Crown in Chancery was carried over to Canada. From 1791 to 1866, there were Clerks for both Lower Canada and Upper Canada. They carried out electoral functions similar to the British Clerk. Following Confederation in 1867, the federal government established the position of Clerk of the Crown to oversee elections. The office was amalgamated into the position of Chief Electoral Officer in 1920.

Notes

References

External links 

Parliamentary Archives, Records of the Clerk of the Crown

Crown Office
English law
Ministry of Justice (United Kingdom)
Civil Service (United Kingdom)
Crown in Chancery